Events from the year 1532 in Ireland.

Incumbent
Lord: Henry VIII

Events

Births
 Nicholas White, lawyer (b. circa 1532)

Deaths

References

 
1530s in Ireland
Years of the 16th century in Ireland